Glaphyria fulminalis, the black-patched glaphyria, is a species of moth of the family Crambidae described by Julius Lederer in 1863. It is found in the eastern part of the United States, from Connecticut to Florida, west to Texas and Illinois.

Adults are on wing from May to August.

References

External links
"Species Glaphyria fulminalis - Black-patched Glaphyria Moth - Hodges#4873". BugGuide. Retrieved January 6, 2018.
"801027.00 – 4873 – Glaphyria fulminalis – Black-patched Glaphyria Moth – (Lederer, 1863)". Moth Photographers Group. Mississippi State University. Retrieved January 6, 2018.
Moths of Maryland

Glaphyriini
Moths described in 1863